The following is a list of cities in French Polynesia:

List

Largest cities

Sources:

List by division
 Marquesas Islands :
Fatu Hiva
Hiva Oa
Nuku Hiva (chef-lieu)
Tahuata
Ua Huka
Ua Pou
 Windward Islands (Society Islands) :
Arue
Faa‘a
Hitia’a O Te Ra
Mahina
Moorea-Maiao
Paea
Papara
Papeete (chef-lieu)
Pirae
Punaauia
Taiarapu-Est
Taiarapu-Ouest
Teva I Uta
 Tuamotus-Gambier:
Anaa
Arutua
Fakarava
Fangatau
Gambier
Hao
Hikueru
Makemo
Manihi
Napuka
Nukutavake
Puka Puka
Rangiroa
Reao
Takaroa
Tatakoto
Tureia
 Austral Islands
Raivavae
Rapa Iti
Rimatara
Rurutu
Tubuai (chef-lieu)
 Leeward Islands (Society Islands)
Bora-Bora
Huahine
Maupiti
Tahaa
Taputapuatea
Tumaraa
Uturoa (chef-lieu)

Sources : INSEE - Code officiel géographique 2005

References

External links

 
French Polynesia
Cities